"Let's Work It Out" is a song by Scottish alternative rock band Texas, released in February 2017 as the lead single from their ninth studio album, Jump on Board (2017). The single was released via PIAS and BMG.

Background
The song was co-written by Sharleen Spiteri and Johnny McElhone, with Johnny McElhone serving as the producer for the track. The track was recorded by the band during recording sessions during 2016–2017 during sessions for their then upcoming studio album, Jump on Board. 

The track features the lyrics which eventually inspired the name of the album Jump on Board. "Go away, go away It's a mad day I jumped on board I wasn't thinking about anything"

Release and promotion 

To coincide with the release of the single, Texas performed the track live on The Chris Evans Breakfast Show on BBC Radio 2 on 9 February 2017. The track was added to the BBC Radio 2 playlist and received heavy airplay, beginning on 9 February 2017. Additionally, lead singer Sharleen Spiteri also had guest appearances on UK television programmes Saturday Kitchen and BBC Breakfast.

Texas performed the track with the BBC Scottish Symphony Orchestra in June 2017 as part of a BBC special, where they performed other of their hits including "Black Eyed Boy" and "Summer Son", amongst others.

Commercial performance
Whilst the single failed to chart in the United Kingdom or their native Scotland, it did chart on both Belgian regions' Ultratip charts, reaching number nine on the Flanders Tip chart.

Music video
The accompanying music video for the single features Spiteri performing the track in front of neon letters which spell "Let's Work it Out", a giant disco ball and driving with a man in a motor vehicle through a city street at nighttime.

Charts

References

2017 singles
2017 songs
Texas (band) songs
Songs written by Sharleen Spiteri
Songs written by Johnny McElhone